Pachyiulus dentiger is a species of millipede from Julidae family that can be found in Albania and Greece.

References

Julida
Animals described in 1901
Millipedes of Europe